Frans Joakim "Jocke" Åhlund (born 9 August 1970 in Stockholm, Sweden) is a Swedish musician, producer and music video director. He is the lead guitarist and lead singer of the band Caesars, and a member of the bands Teddybears, Smile and Les Big Byrd.

Joakim Åhlund is older brother to musician and Teddybears member Klas Åhlund, film producer Johannes Åhlund and illustrator Anna Åhlund. He was raised in Bagarmossen in Stockholm.

Producer and songwriter
Aside from his artist career, Åhlund is also a songwriter and music producer. He has written and produced a number of international artists, such as Giorgio Moroder, Cheryl Cole (her UK #1 song I Don't Care), Charli XCX, Robyn and Petite Meller (whose debut album he produced). Other collaborations include Sia, CeeLo Green, Theophilus London, The Brian Jonestown Massacre, Iggy Pop and songwriters Bonnie McKee and Wayne Coyne. He also produced the two albums För sent för Edelweiss and 2 steg från Paradise by Swedish artist Håkan Hellström.

He collaborated with Chrissie Hynde on her 2014 debut solo album Stockholm, co-writing two of the songs with Hynde, playing guitar, producing, and providing background vocals.

Åhlund has also directed the music videos of "I'll Be Gone" and "When We Were Winning" by Broder Daniel, "New Noise" by Refused and "Black Mask" by The (International) Noise Conspiracy. He is also one of the co-founders of artist collective and record label Ingrid, with among others Lykke Li, Peter Bjorn & John, Christian Kalsson and Pontus Winnberg.

References

1970 births
Living people
Musicians from Stockholm
Swedish male musicians
Swedish record producers